Dean Allsop (sometimes written as Dean Allsopp) (born 6 August 1973 from Derbyshire) is a former English professional darts player who played in British Darts Organisation events and formerly Professional Darts Corporation.

Career
Allsop played in two PDC World Darts Championships in 1999 and 2000, although he never won a game, nor even a set.

World Championship performances

PDC
 1999: Last 32: (lost to Cliff Lazarenko 0–3)
 2000: Last 32: (lost to Nigel Justice 0–3)

References

External links

1973 births
Living people
English darts players
Professional Darts Corporation former pro tour players